Jóhannes "Joey" Harðarson (born 28 July 1976) is an Icelandic football coach and former player. He was most recently the head coach of Norwegian First Division club Start.

Club career
Before the 2004 season, he moved to Norwegian club IK Start and helped secure their promotion. His previous clubs include IA Akranes and the Dutch team FC Groningen. When leaving Start, he joined the smaller local club Flekkerøy IL.

Coaching career
Harðarson became interim head coach at IK Start, after Kjetil Rekdal left the position in April 2019. On 10 July 2019, Start announced that Harðarson would coach the team for the rest of the season. On 23 October 2019, Start announced that Joey Harðarson had agreed to a contract as head coach on permanent basis till the end of the 2021 season. Start finished the 2019 season in third place and qualified for promotion play-offs. Harðarson's Start won promotion to Eliteserien on the away goals rule after a 5–5 draw on aggregate against Lillestrøm in the play-off final. He was sacked on 14 June 2021.

International career
Harðarson has been capped twice for Iceland.

References

External links

 Profile at nifs.no

1976 births
Living people
Johannes Hardarson
Johannes Hardarson
Johannes Hardarson
Johannes Hardarson
Johannes Hardarson
MVV Maastricht players
FC Groningen players
Eredivisie players
SC Veendam players
Expatriate footballers in Norway
Expatriate footballers in the Netherlands
IK Start players
Eliteserien players
Flekkerøy IL players
Johannes Hardarson
Johannes Hardarson
Association football midfielders
Úrvalsdeild karla (football) managers
Flekkerøy IL managers
IK Start managers
Johannes Hardarson
Expatriate football managers in Norway
Eliteserien managers